Black Gold is a 1936 American action film directed by Russell Hopton and starring Frankie Darro,  LeRoy Mason and Gloria Shea.

Main cast
 Frankie Darro as Clifford 'Fishtail' O'Reilly 
 LeRoy Mason as Henry 'Hank' Langford 
 Gloria Shea as Cynthia Jackson  
 Berton Churchill as J.C. Anderson  
 Stanley Fields as Lefty Stevens  
 Frank Shannon as Dan O'Reilly 
 George Cleveland as Clemmons  
 Fred 'Snowflake' Toones as Snowflake  
 Dewey Robinson as Homer

References

Bibliography
 Michael R. Pitts. Poverty Row Studios, 1929-1940: An Illustrated History of 55 Independent Film Companies, with a Filmography for Each. McFarland & Company, 2005.

External links
 
 

1936 films
1930s action drama films
American action drama films
American black-and-white films
Works about petroleum
1936 drama films
Films directed by Russell Hopton
1930s English-language films
1930s American films